"Young at Heart" is a song by British female music trio Bananarama, released from their debut album, Deep Sea Skiving, in 1983. The song was later recorded by Scottish pop group the Bluebells, whose version reached the top of the UK Singles Chart after a re-release in 1993.

Bananarama version
Bananarama's version of the song is credited to Sara Dallin, Siobhan Fahey and Keren Woodward of Bananarama, and Robert Hodgens of the Bluebells, Fahey's then-boyfriend.

The Bluebells version

The song was reworked in 1984 by the Bluebells, a version originally credited to Hodgens and Fahey upon its re-release in 1993. In 2002, the session musician Bobby Valentino, who performed the violin solo on the Bluebells' version of "Young at Heart", won the right to be recognised as co-author of the song after taking legal action.

The Bluebells' version of the song was a UK top-10 chart success on two occasions, first reaching number eight on the UK Singles Chart during its original release in 1984. Almost a decade later, after the Bluebells had disbanded, the song was re-released as a single on 15 March 1993 after being featured in a British TV advert for the Volkswagen Golf. It became a number-one hit on the UK chart for four weeks, leading to the band reforming temporarily to perform the song on BBC Television's Top of the Pops, on which they commented on the unexpected re-release by parodying various other famous acts of the time such as Shabba Ranks and 2 Unlimited.

Track listings

1984 release
7-inch single
A. "Young at Heart"
B. "Tender Mercy"

Japanese 7-inch single
A. "Young at Heart"
B. "Everybody's Somebody's Fool"

1993 release
UK 7-inch and cassette single
 "Young at Heart" – 3:27
 "I'm Falling" – 4:09

UK CD single
 "Young at Heart" – 3:27
 "Cath" (remix) – 3:15
 "I'm Falling" – 4:09
 "The Patriot Game" – 4:14

Charts

Weekly charts

Year-end charts

Certifications

References

1984 singles
1993 singles
1983 songs
Bananarama songs
The Bluebells songs
Irish Singles Chart number-one singles
London Records singles
Songs written by Keren Woodward
Songs written by Sara Dallin
Songs written by Siobhan Fahey
UK Singles Chart number-one singles